Hussein, Pasha Roshdy (1863–1928) was an Egyptian political figure of Turkish origin
who served as Prime Minister of Egypt between 1914 and 1919.

Biography 
Born in family origins of which are in Kavala. His great grandfather Topuzoglou (also pronounced as 'Tabuzoglu' which in Turkish means 'Son of Cannon' and indicates linear descent from janissary) who came with Muhammad Ali of Egypt and for his success against British invasion in Rosetta was appointed by him with governorship of Alexandria.

Served as last Prime Minister of Khedivate of Egypt till 19 December 1914 and continued in his office as the first Prime Minister of Sultanate of Egypt.
Under pressure from British authorities, Roshdy issued a “Decision of the Council of Ministers” which essentially declared war against the Central Powers in the First World War.  He was later forced to resign for failing to resolve a strike by government officials demanding mandatory recognition of the Egyptian delegation by the cabinet and the withdrawal of British sentries and guards.

He was married to a daughter of the Ottoman sultan's chief of staff and had second marriage to Eugénie Le Brun. His sister was married to Hasan Pasha Mahmoud, dean of the Faculcy of Medicine at Cairo University and king's private physician.

Notes

See also
Eugénie Le Brun

1863 births
1928 deaths
19th-century Egyptian people
20th-century prime ministers of Egypt
Prime Ministers of Egypt
Foreign ministers of Egypt
Egyptian people of Turkish descent
Egyptian pashas
Honorary Knights Grand Cross of the Order of St Michael and St George